Ilmari Pitkänen (born July 18, 1990) is a Finnish professional ice hockey Left Wing who currently plays for SaiPa in the Finnish Liiga. He joined SaiPa on a two-year contract from Espoo Blues on April 16, 2014.

References

External links

1990 births
Living people
People from Ylöjärvi
Jokerit players
Espoo Blues players
Jokipojat players
Kiekko-Vantaa players
SaiPa players
Finnish ice hockey left wingers
Sportspeople from Pirkanmaa